Dreamville Presents: REVENGE is a documentary based on creation and recording of the compilation album Revenge of the Dreamers III. It was released on July 2, 2019 by Dreamville, to YouTube.

Background 
On January 6, 2019, Dreamville announced the compilation album on social media by uploading a gold poster-like invitation. The poster read: Your presence and participation is requested for the recording sessions of the upcoming compilation album Revenge of The Dreamers III. Recording sessions took place in Atlanta at Tree Sound Studios beginning January 6 through January 16, 2019. The invitation was posted by recipients on social media by many artists and producers including Big K.R.I.T., Mike Will Made It, DJ Khaled, Swizz Beatz, Tay Keith, T.I, Rick Ross, 9th Wonder and Wale, among others.

Throughout the 10-days of recording, invitations were shared by the entire Dreamville roster, among other artists and producers outside of Dreamville. Over 100 artists and producers were invited to the sessions. Describing the scene in the several rooms of the studio, videographer Chase Fade said: "There's different energy in all of these different rooms, with a bunch of producers coming in, a bunch of rappers coming in, singers, managers, you name it. If you pop in one room and they're making trap music, you pop in another room and they're making some R&B, pop in another room and they're making some soulful stuff. You never know." According to Dreamville, 142 songs were recorded from 343 invites of artists and producers.

The documentary featured multiple snippets and the creation of songs that made it on the album including "Sacrifices", "Down Bad", "LamboTruck", "Don't Hit Me Right Now", "Wells Fargo (Interlude)", and "1993", as well as songs that did not appear on the album.

Release 
On June 26, 2019, Dreamville released a trailer announcing, Dreamville Presents: REVENGE, a film documenting the album's recording sessions in Atlanta. In the trailer, J. Cole spoke on the recording sessions saying "I had this idea. Let's go somewhere, lock-in and invite a bunch of outside producers and artists to come fuck with us and just make this album." The documentary was released on July 2, 2019 on Dreamville's official YouTube account.

Personnel 
Credits adapted from the documentary film.

Directors of photography
 David Peters
 Matt Patroni
 Chase Fade
 Anthony Supreme

Associate producers
 Matthew Robinson
 Mwango Kasote

Editors
 Matt Carter
 Amani Hill (assistant)

Sound design mixing
 Sam Costello

Colorist
 David Torcivia

Graphics and art design
 Felton Brown

Animation
 David Peters

Release history

References

External links 
 on YouTube

J. Cole
2010s English-language films